The 2012–13 curling season began at the end of August 2012 and ended in April 2013.

Ontario Curling Tour
World Curling Tour events in bold

Teams

Men's events

Women's events

OCT Money List

References

See also
Ontario Curling Tour Home
World Curling Tour Home
Season of Champions Home
Curling Champions Tour Home
International bonspiel calendar

Curling Season, 2012-13
Curling Season, 2012-13
Ontario Curling Tour